Single parents in the South Korea are one of the social issues facing South Korea.

Etymology
The term single-parent family" is a mixture of pure Korean words "한 (single)" "부모 (parent)" and "family." Here, "한" means "big," "full," and "whole," rather than one, meaning that a single parent family is as healthy and happy as any other family.

Type of single-parent family 
Divided into divorced families, bereavement families, single mother families or rich families, and hat families, depending on the background of formation and family composition. With the increase in divorce, the number of single-parent families in all households is on the rise. It can also be classified as a single-parent family if the mother is the primary caregiver, and a single-parent family if the father is the primary caregiver.

Current status data on single-parent families in Korea 
The number of single-parent households rose from 1.37 million in 2005 to 1.594 million in 2010 and 1.639 million in 2011, with the share of single-parent households in total rising from 8.6% in 2005 to 9.2% in 2010 and 9.3% in 2011. The number of single-parent families has been increasing due to factors other than those of single-parent families, with 29.7 percent of single-parent families, 32.8 percent of divorces, and 11.6 percent of single-parent families.

The average age is 43.1 years old, most of whom are divorced parents and have 1.5 children. Income and net worth of single-parent families increased compared to 2015, but were lower than that of the entire household. The average monthly income of single-parent families was 2.19.6 million won per month, up from 18.96 million won in 2015, but the ratio of single-parent families' income to total household income was 56.5%, slightly down from the 2015 survey.

Net assets taking into account financial assets, real estate and liabilities amounted to 85.59 million won, up 29.7 percent from 65.97 million won in 2015. Meanwhile, the ratio of single-parent net worth to total household net worth was 25.1%, slightly up from the 2015 survey.

84.2% of the working population was higher than the total employment rate (60.2%) of the economically active population and higher than the employment rate (61.1%) a year before becoming a single parent.The average working and business income of single parents who were employed was 2.02 million won, up from 17.37 million won in 2015, but still remained low.Employment stability has improved somewhat, with the proportion of commercial workers increasing compared to the previous survey and the proportion of temporary and daily workers decreasing.

Problems for single-parent families in Korea 
First of all, single-parent families cite economic problems as the biggest difficulty. This is because it is difficult to secure a stable and well-paid job as the loss of a spouse reduces income and requires raising children alone. In addition, according to a survey conducted by the Ministry of Health and Welfare in 2011, 83,525 families with hats and 20,479 families with rich families were found to be experiencing more economic difficulties than rich families.

Single-parent families experience changes in family functions, interpersonal problems, child rearing, male and female role rebalancing, financial difficulties and alienation, and loss problems. In particular, female single-parent families were found to be under a lot of stress related to economic problems, child rearing problems, and role tensions caused by falling or losing income, while male single-parent families experienced stress such as emotional problems and household burdens due to lack of mock services.

First, single-parent families cite economic problems as the biggest difficulty. This is because the loss of one's spouse also reduces income and makes it difficult to secure a stable and well-paid job. In addition, a 2011 survey by the Ministry of Health and Welfare showed that there were 83,525 families with a mother and 20,479 families with a father, indicating that the mother and mother households were experiencing more financial difficulties than the rich. This seems to be because women often relied on their husbands financially, and even if they try to get a job again, finding jobs and economic independence are not easy due to the discriminatory labor market and lack of welfare policies for women.

In addition, financial difficulties in single-parent families have also been shown to affect child rearing, and economic stability is considered a very important factor in stabilizing single-parent families. A single parent in an economically poor single-parent family has no time, economic, or psychological leeway to care for their children, which causes them to experience difficulties in physical, psychological, and social growth. Specifically, children of economically poor single-parent families are likely to experience sluggish growth and obesity (news in 2008, low academic achievement levels, difficulties in college, difficulties in depression and anxiety, conflicts with their peers and flight .

Also, most single parents have difficulty raising their children. The mother of a mother family complains of difficulties, such as the absolute lack of time to care for her family or raise her children during her career, and the lack of a spouse to discuss child rearing.

On the other hand, the father of a rich family finds it difficult to live at the same time, housekeeping, and raising children at the same time, and experiences more serious difficulties if his children are under the age of 10. In other words, single-parent families feel nervous and burdened at a time when they have to perform their spouses' roles in addition to their previous roles as mothers or fathers, and face the difficulties of having to do all the necessary roles of family life alone. In addition, children from single-parent families experience difficulties in having time to emotionally digest their father or mother's vacancy and adapting to the change in the absence of one parent.

Single-parent families are often vulnerable to physical and psychological health. There are many unstable daily jobs where the head of a single-parent family works, and the job environment is often poor, such as mainly physical labor. It is also threatened by mental health, such as high depression and experiencing hurt in self-esteem due to social prejudice against single-parent families. Female single parents are likely to be psychologically ineligible due to loneliness, loss of separation from their spouse, sadness, family responsibilities, and the burden of having to take care of their children alone in the absence of their spouse'

In particular, prejudice stemming from the social perception that women should be protected by men psychologically discourages single-parent women and causes them to experience difficulties in both social and family life. On the other hand, single male parents are likely to experience difficulties due to their responsibility to earn a living, the burden of playing the role of a mother, shrinking social activities, society's distorted perception of rich families and fear of stigma.

In addition, single parents experience a vicious cycle of losing their spouse and losing their social support associated with them and narrowing their support to focus on sustaining their livelihoods. The social network here is the primary group, such as parents, siblings, and a secondary group such as friends and neighbors, and relatively higher financial support from relatives and child care support than divorce. However, divorced single parents are more likely to suffer relatively from social support as they lose their spouses' social networks along with divorce.

Korea's welfare system for single-parent families 
The number of single-parent families in Korea is about 1.75 million, or 9.4 percent of all households, with 1.35 million households with hats and 390,000 households with rich families. However, the number of single-parent families receiving government support stands at 595,624 in 225,472 households, or about 13 percent of all single-parent families. This means that about 87 percent of single-parent families do not receive any government support. Korea's single-parent family support policy is based on the Single-parent Family Support Act. The Single-Parent Family Support Act was enacted in 1989 with the aim of contributing to the stabilization of the livelihood and the promotion of welfare of single-parent families by allowing single-parent families to lead healthy and cultural lives. And over the past 25 years, it has greatly contributed to improving the quality of life of single-parent families through several revisions.

In particular, provisions for the protection of human rights and the promotion of rights and interests of single-parent families were newly established in 2011 and 2013, which provided legal grounds for improving social prejudice and discrimination against single-parent families. Along with the creation of a provision for the protection of human rights, some important amendments are made in 2011. It is the revision of the law that protects the remaining family members even if they have children aged 18 or older by expanding the criteria for selecting single-parent families. As a result, single-parent families with children over 18 years of age can continue to receive government support.

References 

Single parents
Society of South Korea